Charles Tremayne is a television executive and producer known for creating a number of TV series in the UK and America. In the UK he was best known for editing World In Action on ITV and for his involvement in the case of the wrongly-convicted Birmingham Six.

In the US he either created or developed several series such as The First 48, American Pickers, Room Raiders, and Sinking Cities for PBS. He is also executive producer of several television movies and other scripted projects.

He first came to America to run the joint venture between The New York Times and ITV Granada, winning a News and Documentary Emmy for a program for NOVA about bioterrorism. He joined RDF to run its New York office in 2007, before joining Cineflix Productions in 2009, becoming President in 2013. He is a former Chair of BAFTA New York and is a Fellow of the Royal Television Society.

World in Action
Tremayne joined Granada Television’s World in Action in 1983 from the BBC where he had been a graduate news trainee. His debut program for the series is believed to be the first ‘life swap’ program on television when he challenged Conservative MP, Matthew Parris, to survive for a week on welfare payments.  The controversial program was one of the highest rated programs in the series’ history. Parris later became a successful correspondent for The Times.

Shortly afterwards Tremayne joined forces with author and politician Chris Mullin to investigate the case of the Birmingham Six and the safety of their conviction for setting off IRA bombs in pubs in Birmingham. Along with producer Ian McBride and researcher Eamon O’Connor, the resulting series of programs eventually led to the release of the six men and the establishment of a Royal Commission on Criminal Justice. Tremayne was portrayed by Roger Allam in the docudrama Who Bombed Birmingham? (also presented as The Investigation: Inside a Terrorist Bombing).

Another controversial investigation, with journalist Tony Watson, exposed the activities of the Economic League, a privately financed organization set up to stop ‘subversives’ working in industry. The three programs led to the collapse of the organization. He co-authored a book with journalist Mark Hollingsworth called The Economic League – The Silent McCarthyism.

He and Hollingsworth later teamed up on a program into the illegal activities of former MP, John Browne, which eventually led to his resignation.

ITV Granada
In 1990 Tremayne became Editor of Regional Features for Granada before becoming an Executive Producer overseeing the long running daytime series, This Morning.

In 1993, he returned to World in Action as its Executive Producer, before taking over all current affairs and documentaries for Granada.  In this period, working with editor Steve Boulton, World in Action had one of its most well known investigations looking into the financial affairs of Defense Minister, Jonathan Aitken. As a result of the program, Jonathan Aitken accused Granada and the Guardian newspaper of libel. In the resulting court case, Aitken was found to have lied to the court and was later imprisoned for perjury.

In 1999, ITV brought World in Action to an end. Granada was successful for winning the competitive tender for its replacement, Britain’s first news magazine show, Tonight with Trevor McDonald.  Tremayne worked with editor Jeff Anderson to launch the series, which debuted with a controversial interview obtained by journalist Martin Bashir with the five men suspected of the Stephen Lawrence murder.

In 2000 he was invited to move to the USA to start a joint venture between Granada and The New York Times.

New York
From 2000, Tremayne partnered with journalists of The New York Times to produce programs for PBS, Discovery, TLC and A&E, including programs for NOVA and Frontline. After the terrorist attacks of 9/11 the team produced many programs for Investigative Reports on A&E, including a critically acclaimed two-hour special, Anatomy of 9/11.  In 2002 their special for NOVA on bioterrorism won a News and Documentary Emmy.

In 2002, when the joint venture came to an end, Tremayne became Executive Vice President for Granada America, whose New York production office made hundreds of hours of programming for American cable channels. He created the long running Room Raiders for MTV, and also co-created, with John X Kim, The First 48, which has enjoyed a run of 20 years on the A&E Network.

In 2007 Tremayne joined RDF USA as Executive Vice President overseeing the east coast production base in New York, which included the production of ABC’s Wife Swap.

Cineflix 
In 2009 he joined the Canadian company Cineflix Productions where he started its New York office and worked with executive producer Mark Poertner to launch American Pickers on the History Channel, which became one of the highest rated and longest-running programs on American television. He worked with William Shatner on William Shatner’s Weird or What? and former Soprano, Steve Schirripa, on Nothing Personal. 

Tremayne became President of Cineflix Productions in 2013, with oversight of series like Property Brothers, Property Virgins, and Mayday/Air Crash Investigation. He developed many other productions including the major cold case investigations The Eleven for A&E/Amazon, Children of the Snow for ID/Hulu, and The Clown and the Candyman for Discovery+. Tremayne’s true crime series include the long-running international series Hours to Kill/The Last 24, Secrets of the Morgue, Last Seen Alive, Surviving Evil, Nowhere to Hide, Murder in Paradise and The Detectives Club. Non-crime series include Sinking Cities for PBS about climate change, and Hitler’s Most Wanted for History. 

Tremayne also developed a new brand of scripted projects based on true stories. He was executive producer of the Lifetime Movies Girl in the Box and Girl in the Bunker with Stephen Kemp, plus two seasons of Gangland Undercover for History. With Jeff Vanderwal he developed and oversaw the award-winning Believe Me: The Abduction of Lisa McVey and the domestic violence expose I Was Lorena Bobbitt.

After 7 years at the helm, Tremayne stepped down as President of Cineflix Productions in 2020 and became Chair of the Cineflix Content Group. He also launched his own production company, First Story Productions, under the Content Group umbrella, with his partner Caroline Grist.

References

External links

British television producers
Living people
Year of birth missing (living people)